The 2006–07 Dallas Mavericks season was the team's 27th in the NBA. The Mavericks entered the season as the runners-up of the 2006 NBA Finals, where they lost to the Miami Heat in six games. They began the season hoping to improve upon their 60–22 output from the previous season. They improved by seven wins, finishing 67–15, claiming the top seed in the Western Conference, and qualifying for the playoffs for the seventh consecutive season. In the first round, they met the eight-seeded Golden State Warriors, and lost in six games in a shocking upset. The Mavericks became the third first-seeded team in NBA history to be eliminated by an eighth-seeded team in the playoffs, following the Seattle SuperSonics in 1994, and the Miami Heat in 1999. The Mavericks had the second best team offensive rating in the NBA.

This would be the last time a 67-win team was eliminated before the Conference Finals until 2016, when the San Antonio Spurs were eliminated by the Oklahoma City Thunder in six games in the Conference Semifinals.

Draft picks

Roster

Regular season

Standings

Record vs. opponents

Game log

|- bgcolor=ffcccc
| 1
| November 2
| San Antonio
| 
| Dirk Nowitzki (21)
| Dirk Nowitzki (11)
| Howard & Terry (4)
| American Airlines Center20,416
| 0–1
|- bgcolor=ffcccc
| 2
| November 4
| @ Houston
| 
| Dirk Nowitzki (24)
| Erick Dampier (9)
| Jason Terry (4)
| Toyota Center18,245
| 0–2
|- bgcolor=ffcccc
| 3
| November 6
| Golden State
| 
| Dirk Nowitzki (26)
| Dirk Nowitzki (11)
| Nowitzki & Terry (6)
| American Airlines Center20,093
| 0–3
|- bgcolor=ffcccc
| 4
| November 8
| @ L.A. Clippers
| 
| Jason Terry (23)
| Dirk Nowitzki (12)
| Devin Harris (5)
| Staples Center18,538
| 0–4
|- bgcolor=ccffcc
| 5
| November 9
| @ Phoenix
| 
| Dirk Nowitzki (35)
| Nowitzki & Dampier (7)
| Anthony Johnson (6)
| U.S. Airways Center18,422
| 1–4
|- bgcolor=ccffcc
| 6
| November 12
| @ Portland
| 
| Dirk Nowitzki (26)
| Dirk Nowitzki (10)
| Jerry Stackhouse (9)
| Rose Garden15,005
| 2–4
|- bgcolor=ccffcc
| 7
| November 14
| Chicago
| 
| Dirk Nowitzki (31)
| Erick Dampier (13)
| Terry & Harris (5)
| American Airlines Center20,274
| 3–4
|- bgcolor=ccffcc
| 8
| November 17
| @ Memphis
| 
| Dirk Nowitzki (26)
| Erick Dampier (15)
| Devin Harris (7)
| FedEx Forum16,727
| 4–4
|- bgcolor=ccffcc
| 9
| November 18
| Memphis
| 
| Dirk Nowitzki (24)
| Dirk Nowitzki (13)
| Anthony Johnson (9)
| American Airlines Center20,535
| 5–4
|- bgcolor=ccffcc
| 10
| November 20
| @ Charlotte
| 
| Dirk Nowitzki (24)
| Erick Dampier (15)
| Devin Harris (6)
| Charlotte Bobcats Arena13,237
| 6–4
|- bgcolor=ccffcc
| 11
| November 21
| Washington
| 
| Dirk Nowitzki (30)
| Dirk Nowitzki (14)
| Nowitzki & Stackhouse (5)
| American Airlines Center20,080
| 7–4
|- bgcolor=ccffcc
| 12
| November 24
| @ San Antonio
| 
| Dirk Nowitzki (31)
| Dirk Nowitzki (10)
| Jason Terry (10)
| AT&T Center18,581
| 8–4
|- bgcolor=ccffcc
| 13
| November 25
| New Orleans/Oklahoma City
| 
| Dirk Nowitzki (28)
| Nowitzki & Diop (9)
| Jason Terry (6)
| American Airlines Center20,315
| 9–4
|- bgcolor=ccffcc
| 14
| November 27
| Minnesota
| 
| Nowitzki & Howard (15)
| Erick Dampier (11)
| Devin Harris (4)
| American Airlines Center19,939
| 10–4
|- bgcolor=ccffcc
| 15
| November 29
| Toronto
| 
| Josh Howard (26)
| Erick Dampier (14)
| Anthony Johnson (8)
| American Airlines Center19,975
| 11–4

|- bgcolor=ccffcc
| 16
| December 1
| Sacramento
| 
| Josh Howard (24)
| Nowitzki & Diop (10)
| Anthony Johnson (10)
| American Airlines Center20,277
| 12–4
|- bgcolor=ffcccc
| 17
| December 4
| @ Washington
| 
| Dirk Nowitzki (27)
| Nowitzki & Dampier (9)
| Jerry Stackhouse (6)
| Verizon Center14,891
| 12–5
|- bgcolor=ccffcc
| 18
| December 5
| @ New Jersey
| 
| Dirk Nowitzki (26)
| Dirk Nowitzki (13)
| Jason Terry (7)
| Continental Airlines Arena16,794
| 13–5
|- bgcolor=ffcccc
| 19
| December 7
| Detroit
| 
| Dirk Nowitzki (29)
| Josh Howard (12)
| Devin Harris (4)
| American Airlines Center20,152
| 13–6
|- bgcolor=ccffcc
| 20
| December 9
| Denver
| 
| Josh Howard (30)
| Josh Howard (11)
| Devin Harris, Jason Terry (6)
| American Airlines Center20,343
| 14–6
|- bgcolor=ffcccc
| 21
| December 11
| @ Utah
| 
| Dirk Nowitzki (26)
| Dirk Nowitzki (10)
| Devin Harris (3)
| EnergySolutions Arena19,911
| 14–7
|- bgcolor=ccffcc
| 22
| December 13
| L. A. Lakers
| 
| Josh Howard (29)
| Dirk Nowitzki (14)
| Jason Terry (9)
| American Airlines Center20,424
| 15–7
|- bgcolor=ccffcc
| 23
| December 15
| Philadelphia
| 
| Jason Terry (18)
| Josh Howard, Erick Dampier (8)
| Dirk Nowitzki (5)
| American Airlines Center20,219
| 16–7
|- bgcolor=ccffcc
| 24
| December 16
| @ New Orleans/Oklahoma City
| 
| Josh Howard (23)
| Dirk Nowitzki (10)
| Jason Terry (6)
| New Orleans Arena16,331
| 17–7
|- bgcolor=ccffcc
| 25
| December 18
| @ Sacramento
| 
| Dirk Nowitzki (29)
| Dirk Nowitzki (13)
| Devin Harris, Jason Terry (6)
| Arco Arena17,317
| 18–7
|- bgcolor=ccffcc
| 26
| December 20
| @ Seattle
| 
| Erick Dampier (22)
| Erick Dampier (16)
| Jason Terry (6)
| KeyArena16,867
| 19–7
|- bgcolor=ccffcc
| 27
| December 22
| L. A. Clippers
| 
| Josh Howard (25)
| Dirk Nowitzki (12)
| Jason Terry (7)
| American Airlines Arena20,311
| 20–7
|- bgcolor=ccffcc
| 28
| December 26
| Charlotte
| 
| Josh Howard (27)
| Erick Dampier (10)
| Jason Terry (7)
| American Airlines Center20,423
| 21–7
|- bgcolor=ccffcc
| 29
| December 28
| @ Phoenix
| 
| Jason Terry (35)
| Josh Howard (12)
| Jason Terry (8)
| American Airlines Center20,483
| 22–7
|- bgcolor=ccffcc
| 30
| December 30
| New Orleans/Oklahoma City
| 
| Jason Terry (25)
| Erick Dampier (9)
| Jason Terry (6)
| American Airlines Center20,433
| 23–7
|- bgcolor=ccffcc
| 31
| December 31
| @ Denver
| 
| Josh Howard (28)
| Josh Howard (17)
| Jason Terry (6)
| Pepsi Center18,423
| 24–7

|- bgcolor=ccffcc
| 32
| January 2
| Seattle
| 
| Dirk Nowitzki (31)
| Dirk Nowitzki (15)
| Jason Terry (5)
| American Airlines Center20,245
| 25–7
|- bgcolor=ccffcc
| 33
| January 4
| Indiana
| 
| Josh Howard (25)
| Josh Howard (11)
| Devin Harris (5)
| American Airlines Center20,398
| 26–7
|- bgcolor=ccffcc
| 34
| January 5
| @ San Antonio
| 
| Dirk Nowitzki (36)
| Josh Howard (11)
| Jason Terry (8)
| AT&T Center18,797
| 27–7
|- bgcolor=ffcccc
| 35
| January 7
| @ L. A. Lakers
| 
| Dirk Nowitzki (29)
| Dirk Nowitzki (13)
| Jason Terry (7)
| Staples Center18,997
| 27–8
|- bgcolor=ccffcc
| 36
| January 9
| @ Utah
| 
| Dirk Nowitzki (38)
| Josh Howard (9)
| Jason Terry (6)
| EnergySolutions Arena19,911
| 28–8
|- bgcolor=ccffcc
| 37
| January 10
| @ Portland
| 
| Jason Terry (20)
| Erick Dampier (10)
| Dirk Nowitzki (5)
| American Airlines Center20,256
| 29–8
|- bgcolor=ccffcc
| 38
| January 12
| @ Indiana
| 
| Dirk Nowitzki (43)
| Dirk Nowitzki (12)
| Jason Terry (7)
| Conseco Fieldhouse15,934
| 30–8
|- bgcolor=ccffcc
| 39
| January 14
| @ Toronto
| 
| Dirk Nowitzki (38)
| Dirk Nowitzki (11)
| Dirk Nowitzki, Josh Howard, Devin Harris (5)
| Air Canada Centre19,800
| 31–8
|- bgcolor=ccffcc
| 40
| January 16
| Houston
| 
| Dirk Nowitzki (30)
| Dirk Nowitzki (10)
| Jason Terry (8)
| American Airlines Center20,332
| 32–8
|- bgcolor=ccffcc
| 41
| January 18
| L. A. Lakers
| 
| Josh Howard (29)
| Josh Howard (11)
| Jason Terry (13)
| American Airlines Center20,446
| 33–8
|- bgcolor=ccffcc
| 42
| January 21
| @ Miami
| 
| Josh Howard (25)
| Dirk Nowitzki, Erick Dampier (11)
| Jason Terry (11)
| AmericanAirlines Arena20,195
| 34–8
|- bgcolor=ccffcc
| 43
| January 23
| @ Orlando
| 
| Dirk Nowitzki (33)
| Dirk Nowitzki (10)
| Dirk Nowitzki (8)
| Amway Arena17,451
| 35–8
|- bgcolor=ffcccc
| 44
| January 25
| @ Chicago
| 
| Dirk Nowitzki (28)
| Dirk Nowitzki (11)
| Jason Terry (6)
| United Center21,822
| 35–9
|- bgcolor=ccffcc
| 45
| January 27
| Sacramento
| 
| Dirk Nowitzki (32)
| Dirk Nowitzki (11)
| Jason Terry (7)
| American Airlines Center20,487
| 36–9
|- bgcolor=ccffcc
| 46
| January 30
| Seattle
| 
| Austin Croshere (34)
| Austin Croshere (7)
| Jason Terry, Jerry Stackhouse, Devin Harris (4)
| American Airlines Center20,326
| 37–9
|- bgcolor=ccffcc
| 47
| January 31
| @ Memphis
| 
| Dirk Nowitzki (26)
| Dirk Nowitzki (11)
| Jason Terry (6)
| FedEx Forum14,762
| 38–9

|- bgcolor=ccffcc
| 48
| February 3
| Minnesota
| 
| Josh Howard, Jason Terry (22)
| DeSagana Diop (12)
| Devin Harris (6)
| American Airlines Center20,467
| 39–9
|- bgcolor=ccffcc
| 49
| February 7
| Memphis
| 
| Dirk Nowitzki (38)
| Dirk Nowitzki (10)
| Devin Harris (8)
| American Airlines Center20,263
| 40–9
|- bgcolor=ccffcc
| 50
| February 9
| Houston
| 
| Josh Howard (22)
| DeSagana Diop (14)
| Jerry Stackhouse (5)
| American Airlines Center20,446
| 41–9
|- bgcolor=ccffcc
| 51
| February 11
| @ Philadelphia
| 
| Dirk Nowitzki (24)
| Dirk Nowitzki (11)
| Jason Terry (11)
| Wachovia Center13,673
| 42–9
|- bgcolor=ccffcc
| 52
| February 13
| @ Milwaukee
| 
| Dirk Nowitzki (38)
| Dirk Nowitzki (11)
| Jason Terry (10)
| Bradley Center16,514
| 43–9
|- bgcolor=ccffcc
| 53
| February 15
| @ Houston
| 
| Dirk Nowitzki (26)
| Josh Howard (11)
| Josh Howard, Jerry Stackhouse (3)
| Toyota Center18,270
| 44–9
|- align="center"
|colspan="9" bgcolor="#bbcaff"|All-Star Break
|- bgcolor=ccffcc
| 54
| February 22
| Miami
| 
| Dirk Nowitzki (31)
| Dirk Nowitzki (11)
| Dirk Nowitzki (6)
| American Airlines Center20,448
| 45–9
|- bgcolor=ccffcc
| 55
| February 24
| Denver
| 
| Dirk Nowitzki (31)
| Dirk Nowitzki (11)
| Dirk Nowitzki (8)
| American Airlines Center20,455
| 46–9
|- bgcolor=ccffcc
| 56
| February 26
| Atlanta
| 
| Dirk Nowitzki (27)
| Dirk Nowitzki (8)
| Jerry Stackhouse (9)
| American Airlines Center20,245
| 47–9
|- bgcolor=ccffcc
| 57
| February 27
| @ Minnesota
| 
| Dirk Nowitzki (23)
| Dirk Nowitzki (14)
| Jason Terry (7)
| Target Center13,326
| 48–9

|- bgcolor=ccffcc
| 58
| March 1
| Cleveland
| 
| Dirk Nowitzki (24)
| Dirk Nowitzki (11)
| Dirk Nowitzki (7)
| American Airlines Center20,428
| 49–9
|- bgcolor=ccffcc
| 59
| March 3
| Orlando
| 
| Jason Terry (29)
| Dirk Nowitzki (9)
| Jason Terry (15)
| American Airlines Center20,468
| 50–9
|- bgcolor="#ccffcc"
| 60
| March 6
| New Jersey
| 
| Jason Terry (24)
| Erick Dampier (14)
| Dirk Nowitzki (5)
| American Airlines Center20,360
| 51–9
|- bgcolor=ccffcc
| 61
| March 11
| @ L. A. Lakers
| 
| Josh Howard (24)
| DeSagana Diop (13)
| Devin Harris (4)
| STAPLES Center18,997
| 52–9
|- bgcolor=ffcccc
| 62
| March 12
| @ Golden State
| 
| Jason Terry, Devin Harris (16)
| Austin Croshere (13)
| Devin Harris (5)
| Oracle Arena18,377
| 52–10
|- bgcolor=ffcccc
| 63
| March 14
| Phoenix
| 
| Jerry Stackhouse (33)
| Dirk Nowitzki (16)
| Dirk Nowitzki (6)
| American Airlines Center20,525
| 52–11
|- bgcolor=ccffcc
| 64
| March 16
| Boston
| 
| Josh Howard, Dirk Nowitzki (30)
| Dirk Nowitzki (12)
| Dirk Nowitzki (4)
| American Airlines Center20,428
| 53–11
|- bgcolor=ccffcc
| 65
| March 18
| @ Detroit
| 
| Dirk Nowitzki (28)
| Dirk Nowitzki (12)
| Jason Terry (6)
| The Palace of Auburn Hills22,076
| 54–11
|- bgcolor=ccffcc
| 66
| March 20
| @ New York
| 
| Josh Howard‚ Dirk Nowitzki (24)
| Erick Dampier (13)
| Jason Terry (6)
| Madison Square Garden19,763
| 55–11
|- bgcolor=ccffcc
| 67
| March 21
| @ Cleveland
| 
| Dirk Nowitzki (23)
| Dirk Nowitzki, Erick Dampier (9)
| Dirk Nowitzki, Devin Harris, Jerry Stackhouse (6)
| Quicken Loans Arena20,562
| 56–11
|- bgcolor=ccffcc
| 68
| March 23
| @ Boston
| 
| Jason Terry (29)
| Josh Howard, DeSagana Diop (11)
| Devin Harris, Jason Terry, Jerry Stackhouse (6)
| TD Garden18,113
| 57–11
|- bgcolor=ccffcc
| 69
| March 25
| @ Atlanta
| 
| Dirk Nowitzki, Josh Howard (28)
| DeSagana Diop (9)
| Jerry Stackhouse (8)
| Philips Arena19,322
| 58–11
|- bgcolor=ccffcc
| 70
| March 27
| @ New Orleans/Oklahoma City
| 
| Josh Howard (25)
| Josh Howard (10)
| Jason Terry, Jerry Stackhouse (7)
| Ford Center19,164
| 59–11
|- bgcolor=ccffcc
| 71
| March 28
| Milwaukee
| 
| Jason Terry (27)
| Erick Dampier (10)
| Devin Harrism Jason Terry (5)
| American Airlines Center20,398
| 60–11
|- bgcolor=ccffcc
| 72
| March 30
| New York
| 
| Dirk Nowitzki (30)
| Erick Dampier (10)
| Jerry Stackhouse, Devin Harris (6)
| American Airlines Center20,468
| 61–11

|- bgcolor=ffcccc
| 73
| April 1
| @ Phoenix
| 
| Josh Howard (28)
| Josh Howard (7)
| Dirk Nowitzki (6)
| US Airways Center18,422
| 61–12
|- bgcolor=ccffcc
| 74
| April 3
| @ Sacramento
| 
| Josh Howard (29)
| Josh Howard, Devean George (8)
| Jason Terry, Jerry Stackhouse (5)
| Arco Arena17,317
| 62–12
|- bgcolor=ffcccc
| 75
| April 6
| @ Denver
| 
| Dirk Nowitzki (22)
| Erick Dampier (13)
| Devin Harris (5)
| Pepsi Center19,752
| 62–13
|- bgcolor=ccffcc
| 76
| April 7
| Portland
| 
| Jason Terry (29)
| Austin Croshere, DeSagana Diop (10)
| Devin Harris (4)
| American Airlines Center20,573
| 63–13
|- bgcolor=ccffcc
| 77
| April 9
| L. A. Clippers
| 
| Dirk Nowitzki (26)
| DeSagana Diop (9)
| Jason Terry (6)
| American Airlines Center20,402
| 64–13
|- bgcolor=ccffcc
| 78
| April 11
| @ Minnesota
| 
| Austin Croshere (19)
| DeSagana Diop (15)
| Jason Terry (6)
| Target Center13,671
| 65–13
|- bgcolor=ffcccc
| 79
| April 13
| Utah
| 
| Dirk Nowitzki (23)
| Dirk Nowitzki, DeSagana Diop (4)
| Devin Harris (8)
| American Airlines Center20,411
| 65–14
|- bgcolor=ccffcc
| 80
| April 15
| San Antonio
| 
| Dirk Nowitzki, Devin Harris (21)
| DeSagana Diop (9)
| Jason Terry (6)
| American Airlines Center20,444
| 66–14
|- bgcolor=ffcccc
| 81
| April 17
| @ Golden State
| 
| Maurice Ager (20)
| J. J. Barea (10)
| J. J. Barea, Greg Buckner (3)
| Oracle Arena20,073
| 66–15
|- bgcolor=ccffcc
| 82
| April 18
| @ Seattle
| 
| Dirk Nowitzki (20)
| Erick Dampier (6)
| Dirk Nowitzki, Jason Terry (5)
| KeyArena16,117
| 67–15

Playoffs

|- align="center" bgcolor="#ffcccc"
| 1
| April 22
| Golden State
| L 85–97
| Josh Howard (21)
| Josh Howard (13)
| Dirk Nowitzki (4)
| American Airlines Center20,732
| 0–1
|- align="center" bgcolor="#ccffcc"
| 2
| April 25
| Golden State
| W 112–99
| Jason Terry (28)
| Josh Howard (11)
| Harris, Stackhouse (4)
| American Airlines Center20,867
| 1–1
|- align="center" bgcolor="#ffcccc"
| 3
| April 27
| @  Golden State
| L 91–109
| Nowitzki, Howard (20)
| Dirk Nowitzki (12)
| Terry, Harris (5)
| Oracle Arena20,629
| 1–2
|- align="center" bgcolor="#ffcccc"
| 4
| April 29
| @  Golden State
| L 99–103
| Dirk Nowitzki (23)
| Dirk Nowitzki (15)
| Jason Terry (4)
| Oracle Arena20,672
| 1–3
|- align="center" bgcolor="#ccffcc"
| 5
| May 1
| Golden State
| W 118–112
| Dirk Nowitzki (30)
| Dirk Nowitzki (12)
| Devin Harris (7)
| American Airlines Center21,041
| 2–3
|- align="center" bgcolor="#ffcccc"
| 6
| May 3
| @  Golden State
| L 86–111
| Howard, Stackhouse (20)
| Dirk Nowitzki (10)
| Devin Harris (9)
| Oracle Arena20,677
| 2–4
|-

Player statistics

Regular season 

|-
| 
|| 32 || 1 || 6.7 || .314 || .333 || .606 || .7 || .2 || .1 || .1 || 2.2
|-
| 
|| 33 || 1 || 5.8 || .359 || .286 || .667 || .8 || .7 || .0 || .0 || 2.4
|-
| 
|| 76 || 11 || 18.1 || .441 || .311 || .794 || 2.1 || .9 || .6 || .1 || 4.0
|-
| 
|| 61 || 2 || 11.9 || .351 || .286 || .865 || 3.0 || .7 || .2 || .1 || 3.7
|-
| 
|| 76 || 73 || 25.2 || .626 || . || .623 || 7.4 || .6 || .3 || 1.1 || 7.1
|-
| 
| style=";"| 81 || 9 || 18.3 || .470 || .000 || .558 || 5.4 || .4 || .5 || style=";"| 1.4 || 2.3
|-
| 
|| 60 || 17 || 21.4 || .395 || .353 || .750 || 3.6 || .6 || .8 || .4 || 6.4
|-
| 
|| 80 || 61 || 26.0 || .492 || .280 || .824 || 2.5 || 3.7 || style=";"| 1.2 || .3 || 10.2
|-
| 
|| 70 || 69 || 35.1 || .459 || .385 || .827 || 6.8 || 1.8 || style=";"| 1.2 || .8 || 18.9
|-
| 
|| 21 || 0 || 3.8 || .313 || . || .875 || .5 || .3 || .1 || .2 || .8
|-
| 
|| 40 || 0 || 14.1 || .411 || .379 || .724 || 1.2 || 2.0 || .4 || .0 || 3.8
|-
| 
|| 12 || 0 || 5.9 || style=";"| .647 || . || .389 || 1.8 || .0 || .1 || .0 || 2.4
|-
| 
|| 78 || 78 || style=";"| 36.2 || .502 || .416 || .904 || style=";"| 8.9 || 3.4 || .7 || .8 || style=";"| 24.6
|-
| 
|| 67 || 8 || 24.1 || .428 || .383 || .847 || 2.2 || 2.8 || .8 || .1 || 12.0
|-
| 
| style=";"| 81 || style=";"| 80 || 35.1 || .484 || style=";"| .438 || .804 || 2.9 || style=";"| 5.2 || 1.0 || .2 || 16.7
|-
| 
|| 5 || 0 || 8.6 || .385 || . || style=";"| 1.000 || 1.6 || .2 || .4 || .2 || 2.4
|}

Playoffs 

|-
| 
|| 3 || 0 || 8.0 || .556 || .667 || .500 || 1.0 || .0 || .0 || .0 || 5.0
|-
| 
|| 2 || 0 || 2.0 || . || . || .000 || .0 || .0 || .0 || .0 || .0
|-
| 
| style=";"| 6 || 0 || 7.3 || .000 || .000 || .500 || 1.0 || .3 || .3 || .2 || .2
|-
| 
|| 3 || 0 || 11.3 || .333 || style=";"| .750 || style=";"| 1.000 || 2.0 || .0 || .0 || .0 || 5.0
|-
| 
|| 5 || 2 || 7.6 || .667 || . || .500 || 3.4 || .2 || .0 || .0 || 1.0
|-
| 
| style=";"| 6 || 3 || 23.3 || .600 || . || .429 || 6.8 || .3 || .5 || style=";"| 1.7 || 3.5
|-
| 
| style=";"| 6 || 1 || 18.2 || .200 || .250 || .800 || 3.0 || .7 || 1.0 || .3 || 3.5
|-
| 
| style=";"| 6 || style=";"| 6 || 27.2 || .492 || .300 || .737 || 2.0 || style=";"| 5.0 || 1.0 || .2 || 13.2
|-
| 
| style=";"| 6 || style=";"| 6 || style=";"| 41.3 || .515 || .389 || .704 || 9.8 || 2.8 || style=";"| 2.2 || .8 || style=";"| 21.3
|-
| 
| style=";"| 6 || style=";"| 6 || 39.8 || .383 || .211 || .840 || style=";"| 11.3 || 2.3 || 1.8 || 1.3 || 19.7
|-
| 
| style=";"| 6 || 0 || 28.2 || .348 || .355 || .879 || 3.7 || 2.5 || .7 || .2 || 14.3
|-
| 
| style=";"| 6 || style=";"| 6 || 38.2 || .424 || .281 || .833 || 2.3 || 3.7 || .8 || .3 || 17.0
|}

Awards and records
 Dirk Nowitzki, NBA Most Valuable Player Award
 Dirk Nowitzki, All-NBA First Team
 Dirk Nowitzki, NBA All-Star
 Dirk Nowitzki, Player of the Month (Feb 07)
 Dirk Nowitzki, Player of the Week (11/19/06, 01/14/07)
 Josh Howard, NBA All-Star
 Josh Howard, Player of the Week (12/24/06, 12/31/06)

Notable transactions
 Maurice Ager was selected as the #28 pick in the First Round of the 2006 NBA draft by the Dallas Mavericks. Maurice Ager signed a multi-year contract with the Dallas Mavericks on July 1, 2006.
 Josh Howard was selected as the #29 pick in the First Round of the 2003 NBA draft by the Dallas Mavericks. Josh Howard signed a multi-year contract with the Dallas Mavericks on July 3, 2003. Josh Howard signed a multi-year extension with the Dallas Mavericks on October 28, 2006.
 Austin Croshere was acquired in a trade by the Dallas Mavericks from the Indiana Pacers on July 12, 2006.
 Jason Terry was acquired in a trade by the Dallas Mavericks from the Atlanta Hawks on September 4, 2004. Jason Terry re-signed to a multi-year contract as a free agent with the Dallas Mavericks on July 24, 2006.
 Jose Barea signed a multi-year contract as a free agent with the Dallas Mavericks on August 16, 2006.
 Greg Buckner signed a multi-year contract as a free agent with the Dallas Mavericks on July 13, 2006.
 Devean George signed a multi-year contract as a free agent with the Dallas Mavericks on August 2, 2006.
 D. J. Mbenga signed a multi-year contract with the Dallas Mavericks on July 14, 2004. D.J. Mbenga re-signed to a multi-year contract as a free agent with the Dallas Mavericks on July 12, 2006.
 Pops Mensah-Bonsu signed a multi-year contract as a free agent with the Dallas Mavericks on August 3, 2006.
 Kevin Willis signed a contract with the Dallas Mavericks on April 2, 2007. Kevin Willis re-signed to a contract as a free agent with the Dallas Mavericks on April 12, 2007.

References

Dallas Mavericks seasons
Dallas
Dallas